Heterothops is a genus of beetles belonging to the family Staphylinidae.

The genus has cosmopolitan distribution.

Species:
 Heterothops aeneiventris Smetana, 1971
 HHeterothops amabilis Last, 1975

References

Staphylinidae
Staphylinidae genera